According to the Book of Mormon, King Benjamin, son of King Mosiah the first, was the second Nephite king to rule over Zarahemla. An account of his life and teachings are recorded in both the Words of Mormon and the Book of Mosiah. He was considered a king and a prophet, and was the spiritual and governmental leader of his people. He is believed to have been born roughly 190 BC.

He is best associated with a speech to the people which begins in Mosiah Chapter 2. He talks about righteous living, and shares some of his philosophies of government, stating that the laws he and his father made are based on the commandments of God. He reminds the people that he has not oppressed them with taxes but worked with his own hands to support himself. He then prophesies of Jesus Christ—His birth which is more than 100 years away, His life, His ministry, His death and resurrection. Benjamin explains Jesus' atonement for the sins of mankind, and persuades the people to accept Jesus as their Savior.

King Benjamin also proclaims that his son Mosiah will become the next king over the people. Benjamin, while still alive, gave the throne to him.

Benjamin was a humble man who worked with his own hands to maintain himself and his family, refusing to live off his people or to surround himself with the trappings of wealth and power.

Benjamin as record-keeper
In later editions of the Book of Mormon, "Benjamin" was changed to "Mosiah," since at the time the Nephites obtained the Jaredite records, Benjamin had handed over the throne to Mosiah his son. However, Hugh Nibley, a prominent 20th century LDS scholar, strongly objected to this change. "It was Benjamin who displayed the zeal of a life-long book-lover in the keeping and studying of records; and after he handed over the throne to his son Mosiah he lived on and may well have spent many days among his beloved records. And among these records could have been the Jaredite plates, which were brought to Zarahemla early in the reign of Mosiah, when his father could have still been living.

Analyses of King Benjamin's speech
In his book Since Cumorah, Hugh Nibley studies Benjamin's oration as an archetypal coronation speech. In Nibley's view, one of the main purposes of the kings' speech is on the peaceful continuation of the kingdom as the throne passes on to the rightful heir.
LDS scholars such as John W. Welch have analyzed King Benjamin's speech as a masterful example of chiasmus.

Old Testament parallels
According to Matthew B. Brown, parallels can be detected between the Jubilee year celebration in ancient Israel, the Feast of the Tabernacles, the coronation ceremony, and some of the material that is recorded in the book of Mosiah, especially concerning King Benjamin's sermon.

Famous quotation
King Benjamin said: "When ye are in the service of your fellow beings ye are only in the service of your God."

In fiction
The story "The Grave of a King", by Yusuf Haddad, is about the finding of the grave of King Benjamin by a group of archaeologists. Since the grave lacks any rich funeral offerings or any sign of opulence, the archaeologists conclude the grave is that of a simple ordinary peasant.

Notes

References

 
 
 .

Benjamin, King